The Read the Bills Act (RTBA) is proposed legislation intended to require the United States Congress to read the legislation that it passes. It was originally written in 2006 by Downsize DC, a non-profit organization focused on decreasing the size of the federal government. The proposed act is a response to the passing of bills that are thousands of pages long and are passed without copies being made available to the members of Congress who vote on the bill.  The bill is aimed at limiting the size and growth of the federal government.

Senator Rand Paul (R-KY) stated his support for it in November 2010. Paul went on to sponsor and propose the bill in the 112th congress as S.3360 on June 28, 2012. 

Similarly, a separate bill nicknamed the "Read the Bill Act" would require bills to be posted publicly 72 hours prior to consideration in Congress. Unlike the Downsize DC proposal, this bill is supported by ReadTheBill.org (part of the Sunlight Foundation) with the primary aim to increase transparency in government. It was introduced in the U.S. House (by Brian Baird in 2006 , 2007 , and 2009 ) and Senate (by Jim Bunning in 2009 , and by John Ensign in 2011 ). The Senate version differs in a few ways, including a requirement to have the Congressional Budget Office provide an evaluation of the proposed legislation.

See also
Downsize DC Foundation

References

External links
Downsize DC's page on the act

United States proposed federal government administration legislation
Rand Paul
Proposed legislation of the 112th United States Congress
Proposed legislation of the 113th United States Congress
Proposed legislation of the 114th United States Congress
Proposed legislation of the 115th United States Congress
Proposed legislation of the 116th United States Congress
Proposed legislation of the 117th United States Congress